The Dawning of a New Age is a fantasy novel set in the Dragonlance campaign setting of the Dungeons & Dragons fantasy role-playing game.

The novel was written by Jean Rabe and based on characters and settings from Margaret Weis and Tracy Hickman's book Dragons of Summer Flame (1995). Published in 1996, it is the first volume of a three-part series based on the aftermath of the Chaos War.

Plot summary
In the final moments of the Chaos War, Palin Majere descends into the Abyss to fight Chaos and defeats him with help of his future wife, Usha Majere, and other allies. Due to Chaos’ defeat, all the powerful magic on Krynn has disappeared as the Gods took it with them.

Back on Krynn, the blue dragon Khellendros, better known as Skie to humans, is searching for a different plane of existence to find Kitiara Uth Matar using magic portals located on Krynn. Khellendros plans on finding a worthy body for Kitiara to take and come back to life on Krynn. Khellendros finds a draconian and creates spawn from the draconian using a tear from his eye.

Back in Solace, Palin has a dream of a dragon destroying the Tower of Sorcery in Palanthas. The Master of the Tower in Palanthas then destroys the Tower to prevent any dragon from getting any magical artifacts.

A new large female red dragon, Malystryx, known as Malys, shows up to Ansalon and gains power over all other dragons. As she is gaining power, dragon overlords are established after word spreads. This process takes years, and in the meantime she eats smaller and weaker dragons to gain more power and strength. Malys and Khellendros agree to an alliance and eventually Khellendros realizes that humans are better for spawn then draconians are.

The Conclave of Wizards convenes and establish that they must find another way to make magic and defend themselves from the dragon overlords.

At the Tomb of Heroes in Solace, a young man, Dhamon Grimwulf is visiting and paying his respects to the fallen heroes of the Chaos War. While he is at prayer, he suddenly receives a vision from Goldmoon, one of the last surviving Heroes of the Lance. The vision calls for Dhamon to aid her in a quest she has prepared for him and to meet her at the Citadel of Light.

All the meanwhile, a young male kender named Raf Tanglemop, and an elderly kender woman named Vera-Jay “Blister” Nimblefingers, decide to tag along with Dhamon on his way to see Goldmoon. The three companions arrive at Newports where they meet a dark-skinned mariner, Rig Mer-Krel, and his female friend, Shaon. They are joined by a dwarf, Jasper Fireforge, nephew of a Hero of the Lance Flint Fireforge, who once made a promise to his uncle Flint in a dream to aid Goldmoon in her quest.

Goldmoon instructs her new heroes that they must travel to Palanthas where they are to meet Palin Majere and stop the evil there. Goldmoon gives Dhamon a cloth that was once tied to the famed Dragonlance. Jasper offers the mariners, Rig and Shaon, his ship appropriately titled, “Flint’s Anvil” as payment for their trip to Palanthas. One of the members of the crew is of this is a half-ogre named Groller whose sidekick is a red wolf named Fury.

However, on the way to Palanthas, the kender, Raf, is killed in a freak accident on the ship and is buried at sea. He becomes the first of the new heroes to die.

The companions first arrive at Caergoth on the way to Palanthas and confront some Knights of Takhisis. Dhamon and Rig get in a fight with the dark knights over their treatment of a beautiful Kagonesti elf named, Feril Dawnsprinter. She is in Caergoth trying to recruit knights to help fight the white dragon Gellidus, who has taken over her land in Southern Ergoth and changed the climate in the process. During the confrontation, one of the dark knights recognizes that Dhamon, who looks very familiar to him.

A hurdlefolk named Fissure shows up one day to Khellendros and brings two wyverns with him. Khellendros informs Fissure that he wants humans for his spawn. Fissure responds to Khellendros to get artifacts from the Age of Dreams, as they have the most magic still left in them that Khellendros can use. This magic is to be used to re-open the portals and bring Kitiara back. He tells Fissure to search for these artifacts to get ogres and dark knights on his side so they can capture humans on the outskirts of Palanthas.

In Palanthas, the companions arrive on the Flint's Anvil to meet Palin Majere. After hearing of people disappearing outside the city, the companions decide to investigate a village on the way to see Palin and are attacked by blue draconian spawn. The companions defeat the spawn and capture one of them with help of magic by Feril. The spawn reveals that they were ordered by their master to attack humans.

All the meanwhile, Khellendros spies on the companions through the eyes of the captured spawn. He also wants to know whatever happened to Palin's parents, two Heroes of the Lance, Caramon and Tika Majere.

Meanwhile, ogres raid the Flint's Anvil docked at Palanthas and take hostage the companions who stayed behind on the ship: Rig, Jasper, and Groller.

The companions eventually meet Palin and the Master of the Tower of Palanthas who is working closely with Dhamon to stop the dragons. Feril and Dhamon see the original Dragonlance handle which is meant for them to take with them. The other half of the Dragonlance is missing and Palin is supposed to lead them to it. Palin and the Master of the Tower figure out where the dragon is hiding out and that the blue dragon is really Skie, from the War of the Lance.

The companions come back to Flint's Anvil only to find out from Blister and Shaon that the others have been taken hostage. Palin uses a spell to summon Fury to find them, while Blister and Shaon decide to stay behind on the ship. Fury leads Palin, Dhamon, and Feril beyond the city to the foothills, where they spot an ogre prison camp and their friends among the prisoners. After a magic distraction by Palin, Feril sneaks into the camp and directs the prisoners away from the camp and a battle ensues. The heroes defeat the ogres, and the ogres tell them that Khellendros wanted humans for spawn.

Meanwhile, Fissure shows up in Khellendros’ cave and tells Khellendros that the humans have been rescued. This upsets Khellendros as he figures out that its Palin behind this and wants him and his friends destroyed. Fissure then disappears only to have Malys suddenly appear in his place. Malys is furious that Khellendors has been creating spawn behind her back and wants an explanation. Khellendros lies to her and says that he was creating spawn for her as a gift. Malys likes the idea of having armies of spawn and wants to create more of them with Khellendros. After Malys leaves, Fissure's wyverns return with a blue dragon named Gale, a former lieutenant of Khellendros. He orders Gale to find Palin and kill him and his friends.

After rescuing the prisoners, Palin, Dhamon, and Feril need to meet up with Palin's parents, Caramon and Tika Majere, who are waiting for them at an inn in Palanthas, where they could pick up the second half of the lance which is in Caramon's possession. Caramon gives Dhamon the haft of the silver lance and the Dragonlance is now complete. A storm suddenly hits Palanthas, but it's not a natural storm, its Gale arriving in the city to find Palin and his companions.

The three of them rush back to the Flint's Anvil where Gale attacks the ship and recognizes Dhamon. It's revealed that they used to be partners in the Chaos War and Dhamon was once a Knight of Takhisis. Gale wants Dhamon to come back with him, but Dhamon refuses to go with Gale, so Gale kills Shaon as punishment before he disappears.

Dhamon leaves the ship to confront Gale in the outskirts of the city, where Gale tells Dhamon that he has a new master now and it's Khellendros. Dhamon decides to fight Gale and while jumping on Gale's back and fighting him above a lake, Dhamon fatally wounds Gale and they both fall and plunge into the lake.

The novel ends with Dhamon being presumed dead and the remaining heroes deciding that they will continue to fight against the dragons in honor of Shaon and Dhamon.

Reception

References

1996 American novels
American fantasy novels
Dragonlance novels
Novels by Jean Rabe